The 2006 Carolina Challenge Cup was a four-team round robin pre-season competition hosted by the Charleston Battery.  The Houston Dynamo won the 2006 tournament and went on to win the MLS Cup that year.

Teams
Four clubs competed in the tournament:

Standings

Matches

Scorers
3 goals
Jaime Moreno (D.C. United)
2 goals
Ben Hollingsworth (Charleston Battery)
1 goal
Ronald Cerritos (Houston Dynamo)
Brian Ching (Houston Dynamo)
Ryan Cochrane (Houston Dynamo)
Alejandro Moreno (Houston Dynamo)
Brian Mullan (Houston Dynamo)

See also 
 Carolina Challenge Cup
 Charleston Battery
 2006 in American soccer

External links
 2006 Carolina Challenge Cup Game Schedule & Tickets

2006
Carolina
Carolina Challenge Cup
Carolina Challenge

it:Carolina Challenge Cup#2006